St Andrew's Anglican Church is a heritage-listed former Anglican church located at South Street, Walcha in the Walcha Shire, New South Wales, Australia. The site was added to the New South Wales State Heritage Register on 2 April 1999.

History 
St Andrew's Anglican Church was the third church to be built in Walcha, and is now the earliest church still standing on its original site. Construction commenced in 1862 with stone quarried from the demolished homestead at the Walcha station, Villa Wolka, and was completed in 1866. Originally known as St Paul's Church, it was renamed St Andrew's in the 1870s. A new church was built in 1963 and the adjacent parish hall was built in 1954.

Description 
St Andrew's Anglican Church is an unspoilt and well crafted Victorian Rustic Gothicstyled church with exceptional original interior and contents. The church remains a fitting testament to the early pioneering families of the Walcha and New England district. The church occupies a commanding position on a knoll above the town. The church is a simple granite building of coursed random rubble in a Rustic Gothic style, given by pointed arched window frames within rectangular openings, steeply pitched roof that was originally shingled and is not iron, and a timber shingled bellcote. The interior is of outstanding simple Gothic quality lit by nine stained glass memorial windows dedicated to the early pioneers of the district.

Heritage listing

St Andrew's Anglican Church in Walcha was listed on the New South Wales State Heritage Register on 2 April 1999. The building is classified by the NSW branch of the National Trust of Australia; and was listed on the now defunct Register of the National Estate.

See also

St Andrew's Anglican Rectory, Walcha
List of former churches in Australia

References

Attribution

External links

Walcha
Articles incorporating text from the New South Wales State Heritage Register
Andrews, St
Andrews, St
Churches completed in 1866
Walcha, New South Wales
Walcha